This is a list of episodes for the television series The Bold Ones: The New Doctors.

Series overview
{| class="wikitable plainrowheaders" style="text-align:center"
! colspan=2| Season
! Episodes
! First aired
! Last aired
|-
| style="width:5px; background:#FFD700"|
| 1
| 10
| 
| 
|-
| bgcolor="FFA500"|
| 2
| 8
| 
| 
|-
| bgcolor="B11030"|
| 3
| 11
| 
| 
|-
| bgcolor="000"|
| 4
| 16
| 
| 
|-
|}

Episodes

Season 1 (1969–70)

Season 2 (1970–71)

Season 3 (1971–72)

Season 4 (1972–73)

References

External links
 

Lists of American drama television series episodes